The women's long jump F44 event at the 2008 Summer Paralympics took place at the Beijing National Stadium at 09:30 on 9 September.
There was a single round of competition, and as there were  only 6 competitors they each had 6 jumps.
The competition was won by Andrea Scherney, representing Austria.

Results

DNS = did not start

References

Athletics at the 2008 Summer Paralympics
2008 in women's athletics